Rory Kerr (born 20 December 1979 in Glasgow) is a former Scotland rugby union international and Glasgow Warriors player. He could play at Fullback or Wing positions.

Amateur career

He played for various clubs. Starting out at amateur level with his local side Strathendrick he moved on to West of Scotland.

He was part of the Glasgow Thistle's squad that went to New Zealand for rugby training.

After a season hampered by injury in 2004-05, Kerr left Glasgow Warriors to go to New Zealand.

He returned to Scotland in 2006 and then played for amateur side Glasgow Hawks.

His career went full circle by going back to his first amateur team Strathendrick in 2011 He still plays for the team.

Professional career

He secured a contract with Glasgow Warriors in 2000. A fans favourite, he wrote a column for the Glasgow Warriors website on being a professional player.

A difficult season under Kiwi Searancke made Kerr almost sign for Newcastle Falcons but he wasn't released by the Glasgow coaches. He stated: ""I was desperate to play rugby. There's nothing worse than training all week, and then not getting on to play. In retrospect, they weren't really the coaches from hell! They tried to change things and had some good ideas. They just didn't get the man-management right." That season, 2002–03, saw Kerr with 3 starts - all in the Scottish Inter-District Championship.

After a season hampered by injury in 2004-05, Kerr left Glasgow Warriors to go to New Zealand.

He presented the match ball before a sell out Scotstoun Stadium in the 12 December 2015 Glasgow Warriors European Champions Cup match against Scarlets in European Rugby Champions Cup match.

International career

He played for Scotland Under 18s and Under 19s in 1997-98. He progressed to play for Scotland A in 2001 before winning his first full cap against Canada.

Outside of rugby

Professionally he is now a Director at Ability Energy UK.

References

External links
ESPN biography

1979 births
Living people
Scottish rugby union players
Scotland international rugby union players
Glasgow Warriors players
Glasgow Hawks players
Strathendrick RFC players
West of Scotland FC players
Scotland international rugby sevens players
Scotland 'A' international rugby union players
Male rugby sevens players
Rugby union players from Glasgow